Mygurudu is a Malayalam-based secret language developed in Northern Kerala during the Malabar Rebellion of 1921.
Prisoners used this coded language to pass messages without getting leaked.

Concepts
The fundamental idea behind Mygurudu involves the swapping of Malayalam alphabets.
For example, Mygurudu uses ‘Ra’ instead of ‘Cha’, and ‘Pa’ instead of ‘Na’.

Current State
Mygurudu had about 400 speakers before 2020, however, the number of speakers has reached 900, and 2,500+ people are learning right now. This is mostly due to online platforms increasing accessibility to language learning resources. 
The Speech Science Research Forum of the Department of Linguistics of Kerala University has digitized and documented the structure of Mygurudu and other dying languages.

The scheme

The following tables give the transposition scheme used in the Mygurudu code.

Vowels

Consonants

Mnemonic
The users had developed a mnemonic to learn and remember this language. The mnemonic was very similar to Sanskrit slokas.

Examples

See also
 Mulabhadra, another Malayalam-based secret language from erstwhile Travancore state (Southern Kerala)
 Byari language of Beary people

References

Languages of Kerala
Malayalam language
Cant languages